Seguenzia compta is a species of extremely small deep water sea snail, a marine gastropod mollusk in the family Seguenziidae.

Description
The translucent nacreous, white shell is broader (6.8 mm) than high (6.4 mm).

Distribution
This marine species occurs off New Zealand in the Bounty Trough at a depth of 1,386 m.

References

External links
 To Encyclopedia of Life
 To World Register of Marine Species
 Marshall, B.A. 1983: Recent and Tertiary Seguenziidae (Mollusca: Gastropoda) from the New Zealand region. New Zealand Journal of Zoology 10: 235-262

compta
Gastropods described in 1983